Brick Hill is a national historic district in Baltimore, Maryland, United States. It is a small, isolated enclave neighborhood of 2- and -story masonry duplexes constructed about 1877 to house workers in the nearby Meadow Mill of the Woodberry Manufacturing Company. All but one of the eleven duplexes are constructed of brick, hence the four-acre enclave's traditional name; the other dwelling is built of stone.  Two small two-story frame houses are also included in the district.

It was added to the National Register of Historic Places in 1988.

References

External links
, including photo dated 2004, at Maryland Historical Trust
Boundary Map of the Brick Hill, Baltimore City, at Maryland Historical Trust

Historic districts on the National Register of Historic Places in Baltimore